The United States Air Force's 2d Airborne Command and Control Squadron was an airborne command and control unit located at Offutt Air Force Base, Nebraska. The squadron was an integral part of the United States' Post Attack Command and Control System, performing the Operation Looking Glass mission with the Boeing EC-135 aircraft.

History

World War II
From its activation in April 1942 until it was disbanded in 1944, the 2d Ferrying Squadron received aircraft at their factory of origin and ferried them to the units to which they were assigned.

Liaison duties in the 1950s
The 2d Liaison Squadron provided emergency air evacuation, search and rescue, courier and messenger service, routine reconnaissance and transportation of personnel.  It regularly operated between Langley Air Force Base, Virginia and Fort John Custis with one Beechcraft C-45 Expeditor and several Stinson L-13s.

In July 1952, the squadron closed at Langley and reopened at Shaw Air Force Base, South Carolina, operating de Havilland Canada L-20 Beavers.  It operated a regular courier service to Pope Air Force Base, North Carolina and Myrtle Beach Air Force Base, South Carolina.  In 1953, the squadron also began operating Sikorsky H-19 helicopters.  The unit was inactivated in June 1954.

Airborne Command Post
The desire for an Airborne Command Post (ABNCP) to provide survivable command and control of Strategic Air Command's nuclear forces came about in 1958.  By 1960, modified KC-135A command post aircraft began pulling alert for SAC under the 34th Air Refueling Squadron (AREFS). On 3 February 1961, Continuous Airborne Operations (CAO) commenced, which meant that there was always at least one Looking Glass aircraft airborne at all times. Starting in 1966, the 38th Strategic Reconnaissance Squadron took over the Looking Glass mission. Eventually, on 1 April 1970, the 2nd ACCS took over the Looking Glass mission flying EC-135C ABNCP aircraft for the duration of the Cold War as a critical member in the Post Attack Command and Control System. There continued to be at least one Looking Glass aircraft airborne at all times providing a backup to SAC's underground command post. Additionally, the 2 ACCS maintained an additional EC-135C on ground alert at Offutt AFB, NE as the EASTAUXCP (East Auxiliary Command Post), providing backup to the airborne Looking Glass, radio relay capability, and a means for the Commander in Chief of SAC to escape an enemy nuclear attack.

The 2nd ACCS was also a major player in Airborne Launch Control System operations. The primary mission of the 2nd ACCS was to fly the SAC ABNCP Looking Glass aircraft in continuous airborne operations, however, due to its close proximity in orbiting over the central US, the airborne Looking Glass provided ALCS coverage for the Minuteman Wing located at Whiteman AFB, MO. Not only did Whiteman AFB have Minuteman II ICBMs, but it also had ERCS configured Minuteman missiles on alert. The EASTAUXCP was ALCS capable, however, it did not have a dedicated ALCS mission.

Lineage
 2d Ferrying Squadron
 Constituted as the 2d Air Corps Ferrying Squadron on 18 February 1942
 Activated on 16 April 1942
 Redesignated 2d Ferrying Squadron on 12 May 1943
 Disbanded on 31 March 1944
 Reconstituted and consolidated with 2d Liaison Squadron and 2d Airborne Command and Control Squadron as the 2d Airborne Command and Control Squadron on 19 September 1985

 2d Liaison Squadron
 Constituted as the 2d Liaison Flight on 27 September 1949
 Activated on 25 October 1949
 Redesignated 2d Liaison Squadron on 15 July 1952
 Inactivated on 22 July 1952
 Activated on 22 July 1952
 Inactivated on 18 June 1954
 Consolidated with 2d Ferrying Squadron and 2d Airborne Command and Control Squadron as the 2d Airborne Command and Control Squadron on 19 September 1985

 2d Airborne Command and Control Squadron
 Constituted as the 2d Airborne Command and Control Squadron on 12 March 1970
 Activated on 1 April 1970
 Consolidated with 2d Ferrying Squadron and 2d Liaison Squadron on 19 September 1985
 Inactivated on 19 July 1994

Assignments
 Midwest Sector, Air Corps Ferrying Command (later 5th Ferrying Group, 16 April 1942 – 31 March 1944
 Ninth Air Force, 25 October 1949 (attached to 4th Fighter Wing (later 4th Fighter-Interceptor Wing))
 Tactical Air Command, 1 August 1950 – 22 July 1952 (remained attached to 4th Fighter-Interceptor Wing to 1 September 1950, attached to 363d Tactical Reconnaissance Wing 1 September 1950, 47th Bombardment Wing 12 March 1951, 4430th Air Base Wing after 12 February 1952)
 Ninth Air Force, 22 July 1952 – 18 June 1954 (attached to 363d Tactical Reconnaissance Wing)
 55th Strategic Reconnaissance Wing, 1 April 1970
 55th Operations Group, 1 September 1992 – 19 July 1994

Stations
 Hensley Field, Texas (18 February 1942)
 Love Field, Texas, 8 September 1942
 Fairfax Airport, Kansas, 16 January 1943 – 31 March 1944
 Langley Air Force Base, Virginia, 25 October 1949 – 22 July 1952
 Shaw Air Force Base, South Carolina, 22 July 1952 – 18 June 1954
 Offutt Air Force Base, Nebraska, 1 April 1970 – 19 July 1994

Awards and Campaigns
Air Force Outstanding Unit Award
1 July 1970 – 30 June 1971
1 July 1972 – 30 June 1974
1 July 1974 – 30 June 1976
1 July 1976 – 30 June 1978
1 July 1978 – 30 June 1980

Aircraft & Missiles Operated
Various aircraft (1942–1944)
 Beechcraft C-45 Expeditor (1949–1952)
 Stinson L-13 (1949–1952)
 de Havilland Canada L-20 Beaver (1952–1954)
 Sikorsky H-19 (1953–1954)
 Boeing EC-135 (1970–1994)

See also
Airborne Launch Control System
Survivable Low Frequency Communications System
Ground Wave Emergency Network
Minimum Essential Emergency Communications Network
Emergency Rocket Communications System
The Cold War
Game theory
Continuity of government

References
 Notes

 Citations

 Bibliography

External links
 2d Airborne Command and Control Squadron Website

United States nuclear command and control
002
Continuity of government in the United States
Military units and formations established in 1970
Command and control squadrons of the United States Air Force